Donald Maynard Dokken (born June 29, 1953) is an American singer and musician. He's best known for being the lead singer, occasional guitarist, and founder of the glam metal band Dokken. He is known for his vibrato-laden, melodic vocal style which has made him an influential figure in American heavy metal/glam metal.

After enjoying mainstream success with Dokken, he parted ways with the band in 1988 and pursued a solo career. His 1990 solo album, Up from the Ashes, spawned two singles and achieved modest success. He released his second solo album, titled Solitary, in 2008, which was a stylistic departure from his Dokken material.

Don reformed Dokken in the early 1990s and has been continuing on with the band ever since. He is the only remaining original member of Dokken.

Biography

Early success 
In the late 1970s, Don Dokken was playing in a Los Angeles-based band called Airborn, and had the opportunity to reach a record deal in Germany. After seeing the band Xciter with future bandmates George Lynch and Mick Brown, he tried to recruit them for a new band. Lynch and Brown were not interested in joining forces with him when he first contacted them. Don, with the help of one of Xciter's songs, secured the deal in Germany and convinced Lynch and Brown, along with bassist Juan Croucier, to join him in Dokken soon after he received it.

During his time in Germany, Dokken befriended the German hard rock band Scorpions, and sang with them in rehearsals for their Blackout album while lead vocalist Klaus Meine was being treated for nodes on his vocal cords. Don has stated that he recorded scratch vocals for "No One Like You", "You Give Me All I Need", and "Dynamite". Don also stated, "I was just helping Klaus out", and "You’ll never hear those [tracks]… because it’s not fair to the Scorpions." Meine recovered and returned to record the album.

In 1983, America saw the release of the first Dokken album, Breaking the Chains, which got a moderate reception. After Juan Croucier left the band to join Ratt, Jeff Pilson was brought in for their second release, Tooth and Nail, and at this time metal fans and critics began to take notice of the band. Don's strong, melodic vocals, coupled with Lynch's blazing guitar playing, guided Dokken to national fame.

Solo release 
In the late 1980s, however, personal tension between Dokken and Lynch took its toll on the band. In 1988, after the Monsters of Rock Tour and a further platinum album, Don Dokken decided to break up the band and they went on their separate ways. Don Dokken originally wanted to continue on under the Dokken moniker, but since the other three members shared partial ownership over the Dokken name, he was forced to put out his next album under his own name, and it became known as his first solo album.

The album, titled Up from the Ashes, was released in 1990, and was very similar to the Dokken catalog. This project was a supergroup of sorts, made up of guitarists John Norum (of Europe fame) and Billy White (of Watchtower fame), bassist Peter Baltes (of Accept fame), and drummer Mikkey Dee (of King Diamond and Motörhead and Scorpions). John Norum's drummer Hempo Hildén was initially part of the band but was replaced by Dee before the album was recorded. Baltes had previously been a member of Dokken during the late 1970s for a brief period. Two music videos were made for the singles "Mirror Mirror" and "Stay", respectively. Also, during the late 1980s and early 1990s, Don spent time as a producer for the metal band XYZ.

He also made a guest appearance on the German progressive metal band Vanden Plas's Spirit of Live album as the vocalist for their live performance of Dokken's "Kiss of Death", the studio version of which can be found on Vanden Plas's Far Off Grace album.

Dokken reunion 

Around late 1993, Don started to talk with Mick Brown, who had recently left George Lynch's new group, Lynch Mob. They joined up with Jeff Pilson, and started to write new songs. In 1994, they sent what they had written to George Lynch, who was impressed with the material. Together, they decided to reunite and tour again. This reunion lasted for three years and resulted in two new Dokken albums, an acoustic live disc, and a full live concert recorded in Japan in 1995.

In the late 90s, Dokken once again parted ways with George Lynch, gained guitarist Reb Beach, and later kicked off a new era with guitarist John Norum after the departure of Reb Beach. That union didn't last long, as Norum soon departed to re-unite with Europe. Norum was briefly replaced by Italian guitarist Alex De Rosso for the live tour until 2003 when Don managed to find a permanent replacement in guitarist/lawyer Jon Levin.

Since 1994, Dokken has released six studio albums, two live albums, a Greatest Hits album, as well as their first two DVDs. Don Dokken released a new solo album titled Solitary in 2008, and Dokken released a new album titled Lightning Strikes Again during the same year. On March 1, 2010, the band Dokken's second greatest hits album, aptly titled Greatest Hits, was digitally released to iTunes and Amazon.com. The physical album with additional tracks was released in US by Cleopatra Records May 4, 2010, and in Japan May 11, 2010, by King Records (Japan).

On September 22, 2010, in an interview with BraveWords.com, Don Dokken revealed that he would be undergoing vocal surgery, to correct problems with nodes and tears in his vocal chords. February 4, 2011, Anchorage, Alaska was Dokken's first show since surgery. In addition to the vocal chord surgery, Dokken underwent treatment for cancer around the same time. He has since recovered and his voice has seen great improvement over the past few years.

Discography

Studio albums

Tribute album appearances 
 Hear 'n Aid – "Stars" (1986)
 Smoke on the Water – A Tribute to Deep Purple (1994) (lead vocals on "Fireball")
 Humanary Stew: A Tribute to Alice Cooper (1999) (lead vocals on "Eighteen")
 Frankie Banali and Friends – 24/7/365: The Tribute to Led Zeppelin (2007) (lead vocals on "Kashmir")

Other appearances 
 Great White – Out of the Night (1983) (backing vocals on On Your Knees)
 Sexist – Demo (1983) (backing vocals)
 Twisted Sister – Come Out and Play (1985) (backing vocals)
 Herman Rarebell – Herman Ze German and Friends (1986) (lead vocals on I'll Say Goodbye, Destiny, and Hard Sensation)
 Munetaka Higachi with Dream Castle – Free World (1997) (lead vocals on Tell Me True)
 Vanden Plas – Spirit of Live (2000) (lead vocals on Kiss of Death)
 Eizo Sakamoto – Shout Drunker (2002) (lead vocals on Crescent Moon)
 Kelly Keeling – Giving Sight To The Eye (2005) (backing vocals)
 Paris Keeling – End of Ride Revisited (2009) (lead vocals on I've Found, Tears Of Heaven)
 United Rockers 4U – One Family (2011)
 Alex De Rosso – Lions & Lambs (2013) (lead vocals on Disappear)
 Herman Rarebell & Friends – Acoustic Fever (2013) (lead vocals on You Give Me All I Need)
 Herman Rarebell – Herman's Scorpions Songs (2014) (lead vocals on You Give Me All I Need)
 Wolfpakk (Michael Voss & Mark Sweeney) – Rise of The Animal (2014) (lead vocals on Running out of Times)
 D.H. Cooper – Destiny (2015) (lead vocals on I'll Say Goodbye', 'Hard Sensation' and Destiny)

 Production 
 Great White – Out of the Night (1983)
 XYZ – XYZ (1989)
 Antix – Get Up, Get Happy (1984)
 Saint Vitus – C.O.D. (1992)
 Maxx Explosion – Forever'' (2013)

References

External links

1953 births
American heavy metal singers
American male singers
American people of Norwegian descent
Record producers from California
Dokken members
Living people
Musicians from Manhattan Beach, California
Singers from Los Angeles
Glam metal musicians